The 1990 Southern Miss Golden Eagles football team was an American football team that represented the University of Southern Mississippi as an independent during the 1990 NCAA Division I-A football season. In their third year under head coach Curley Hallman, the team compiled an 8–4 record and lost the 1990 All-American Bowl. The Golden Eagles had one of the biggest upsets of the college football season when they beat the Alabama Crimson Tide by a score of 27–24. Another upset followed later in the season when the Golden Eagles beat the Auburn Tigers by a score of 13–12.

Schedule

Roster

Team players in the NFL

References

Southern Miss
Southern Miss Golden Eagles football seasons
Southern Miss Golden Eagles football